The Party of Objective Truth (listed on the ballots as P.O.T.) was a minor political party in the province of Ontario, Canada. It was registered as a party on the last possible day for the 2018 election, and ran candidates in two ridings in that election.

The party website contains a map with a pin placed at the party headquarters, 388 Talbot St., St. Thomas, Ontario, which falls within the riding of Elgin—Middlesex—London, where the P.O.T. had nominated Henri Barrette as its candidate. Derrick Lionel Matthews ran for the P.O.T. in Nepean.

Election results

References

External links

Provincial political parties in Ontario
2018 establishments in Ontario
Political parties established in 2018